Pekapeka Wetland is a wetland reserve located 12 kilometres by road south of Hastings in the Poukawa Basin of Hawke's Bay, New Zealand.

The Hawke's Bay Regional Council began restoring the wetland in the late 1990s with the removal of willows and the construction of a perimeter fence. The Council initially owned about half of the wetland, but this has been increased to 90%. It is rated as the second most ecologically valuable wetland in Hawke's Bay. The Poukawa Stream, which drains Lake Poukawa in the south-west, runs through the Pekapeka Wetland.

References

Hastings District
Protected areas of the Hawke's Bay Region
Wetlands of New Zealand
Nature reserves in New Zealand
Landforms of the Hawke's Bay Region